Peter Doyle (born 26 November 1945) is an Irish former cyclist. He competed at the 1968 Summer Olympics and the 1972 Summer Olympics.

References

External links
 

1945 births
Living people
Irish male cyclists
Olympic cyclists of Ireland
Cyclists at the 1968 Summer Olympics
Cyclists at the 1972 Summer Olympics
People from County Wicklow
Rás Tailteann winners